= Ye Sha =

Ye Sha (Chinese: 叶沙; pinyin: Yè Shā) is a radio personality from Shanghai, China.

Ye Sha starred in "Sunrise companion", "Xiangban dao liming" (English Accompanying You Until Daybreak or With You Till Dawn), a program of the Shanghai Oriental Broadcasting Station, and "Shanghai State of Mind",

Callers ask Ye for advice on various issues. Ye said that her program "provides a relatively private space for people to tell their stories."
